Palpifer madurensis is a moth of the family Hepialidae. It is found in Madura, from which its species epithet is derived.

References

Moths described in 1914
Hepialidae